Mohammad al-Tobaishi was the former head of protocol at the royal court of the House of Saud.



Arrest

On 4 November 2017, Mohammad al-Tobaishi was arrested in Saudi Arabia in a "corruption crackdown" conducted by a new royal anti-corruption committee. This was done on authority of Crown Prince Mohammad Bin Salman.

Al-Tubaishi was reported released on 28 November 2017 after agreeing to pay authorities a sum, reported to be 6 billion Riyals, about 1,6 billion USD.

Controversy  
A viral video on Twitter shared more than 150,000 times shows Mohammad al-Tobaishi slapping a photographer. Al-Tobaishi was head of royal protocol and the assailant in the video. Shortly after he was removed from his position.

References

Living people
Government ministers of Saudi Arabia
1953 births